Cuddalore is a legislative assembly, that includes the city, Cuddalore. Cuddalore assembly constituency is a part of Cuddalore Lok Sabha constituency. Cuddalore will be one of 17 assembly constituencies to have VVPAT facility with EVMs in 2016 Tamil Nadu Legislative Assembly election. It is one of the 234 State Legislative Assembly Constituencies in Tamil Nadu in India.

Madras State

Tamil Nadu

Election Results

2021

2016

2011

2006

2001

1996

1991

1989

1984

1980

1977

1971

1967

1962

1957

1952

References 

 

Assembly constituencies of Tamil Nadu
Cuddalore district